Nicolás Vicente Gallo (born 2 February 1938) is an Argentinian politician and civil engineer who served as Minister of Infrastructure and Housing during the presidency of Fernando de la Rúa between 1999 and 2001. 

He also served as president of Subterráneos de Buenos Aires SE (SBASE), the state-owned company who managed the Buenos Aires Metro in 1983. During his term as its president the Premetro was created. After his term as the president of the SBASE, he was designated the president of ENTel in 1987.

References

Living people
1938 births
Government ministers of Argentina
Infrastructure ministers
Argentine civil engineers